The Prescott Unified School District (PUSD) is a school district serving Prescott, Arizona. It operates four elementary schools, two middle schools, and one high school. The superintendent is Joe Howard.

Service area
In addition to almost all of Prescott it serves most of Williamson and sections of Prescott Valley.

 the district takes in high school students from the Hillside Elementary School District, Kirkland Elementary School District, and Skull Valley School District, as it is required to under law. It also takes students from the Yarnell Elementary School District.

Additionally it took high school students from the Walnut Grove Elementary School District, until that district dissolved in 2021.

Schools
 High school
Prescott High School (Grades 9-12)
 Middle schools
 Mile High Middle School (Grades 7-8)
 Granite Mountain Middle School (Grades 5-6)
 Elementary schools (K-4)
 Taylor Hicks Elementary School
 Abia Judd Elementary School
 Lincoln Elementary School
 Preschool
 Discovery Gardens Preschool

References

External links

School districts in Yavapai County, Arizona
Prescott, Arizona